Pioneer Foods is a South African packaged goods company which in March 2020 became a subsidiary of PepsiCo. It operates in South Africa as well as two other African countries and exports a number of its brands globally. The company's core business is the production, distribution, marketing and selling of a diverse range of food, beverages and related products. The group employs approximately 8600 permanent employees.

The Pioneer Foods brand portfolio includes Bokomo cereals, Liqui-Fruit, Ceres Fruit Juice, SASKO bread, Safari dried fruit & nuts, Spekko rice and White Star maize.

History 
It was created following the merger of two other South African packaged goods companies (SASKO and Bokomo) in 1997. SASKO was renamed Essential Foods while Bokomo Foods and Ceres Beverages were consolidated into a single management structure as Groceries. The international portfolio is a well-established division boasting long-standing relationships in core export markets. The division manages in-county breakfast cereals and fruit snacking operations in the UK.

It was listed on the Johannesburg Stock Exchange ("JSE") in 2008 under the ticker PFG and delisted in 2020 following the acquisition by PepsioCo.

In 2010 Pioneer Foods was fined R195 million by the South African Competition Commission for colluding with other bread producers to raise the price of bread by between 30c and 35c per loaf in 2007.  This fine reflected roughly 10% of Pioneer owned Sasko's 2006 turnover in bread sales.

According to the commission South Africa's four largest milling companies collectively controlling over 90 percent of the local flour market were involved in colluding with each other.  The four firms (Premier Foods, Tiger Brands, Foodcorp and Pioneer Foods facilitated their pricing activities through secret meetings and telephone calls between employees of these firms at various venues, including churches, stadiums and hotels. The commission found that these price-fixing activities had a negative effect on both consumers as a whole as well as preventing smaller bakeries from being effective competitors.

Quantum Foods was unbundled from Pioneer Foods in October 2014 and is listed as a separate entity on the JSE.

In 2016, Pioneer gained a 49% stake in the cereal brand Weetabix in East Africa, which included a partnership with Weetabix UK.

A subsidiary of Pioneer Foods, Pioneer Foods UK, in December 2017 bought UK-based granola brand, Lizi’s, from The GoodCarb Food Company for an undisclosed price. The purchase was reportedly in line with Pioneer Foods' strategic plan to acquire companies in geographies and categories where they have an existing presence.

In May 2018, Pioneer Foods received approval from the Competition Tribunal to buy the outstanding 50.1% of Heinz South Africa, that it didn't already own, on condition that the deal did not lead to significant job losses. The acquisition was effective 1 June 2018, and makes the Heinz SA operation a wholly owned subsidiary. This deal adds the well-known brands of Wellington's, Mama's Pies, Today, and John West to the Pioneer Foods basket of brands.

References

External links
 Pioneer Foods Official Site

Food and drink companies based in Cape Town
Manufacturing companies based in Cape Town
PepsiCo subsidiaries
South African subsidiaries of foreign companies
2020 mergers and acquisitions